Tropidoderus childrenii, the Children's stick insect, was first described in 1833 by Gray.

Description

Generally, the female insect is a medium green color and closely resembles leaves, thus making it difficult to spot in the foliage.  A large, dark blue spot can be found on each hindwing at the base of the remigium and anal lobe. This dark spot is usually hidden when the wings are folded down. The nymphs also have a long yellow strip that runs down the center of their bodies, which exactly matches the color of the leaf vein. The males can look very different, usually more slender and reddish-brown in color.

Life cycle
During adulthood the Children's stick insect mates more than once and females lays eggs its whole life as an adult. The males fly between trees in search for the females to mate with. The females are much larger and heavier than the males and tend to not fly very far or very often. Once they mate, the females will lay the small, oval, gray eggs that will drop to the leaf litter. Laying the eggs in winter, the eggs will hatch in autumn.

Habitat
They usually live in areas where eucalyptus trees are prominent, as their main source of food is the leaves of various gum or eucalyptus trees.

Defense

When disturbed, the Children's stick insect will detach its hind legs from the foliage and repeatedly strike them together. Additionally, it will  flap its hindwings up and down, flashing the dark blue splotches hidden underneath. It has been shown in mantid species that actions like these described can startle and deter predators such as lizards and so it is believed this is the case in the stick insect as well. Furthermore, the Children's stick insect has the ability to drop a limb in order to escape a predator, similar to how lizards can drop their tail.

See also
List of Australian stick insects and mantids

References

External links
Phasmid Study Group: Tropidoderus childrenii
Australian Wildlife - Children's Stick Insect

Phasmatodea
Insects of Australia
Insects described in 1833
Camouflage